is a railway station in the town of Kawanehon, Haibara District, Shizuoka Prefecture, Japan, operated by the Ōigawa Railway. In between Abt Ichishiro Station and Nagashima Dam Station, the gradient is very steep and an Abt rack system is used.

Lines

Station layout
The station has two opposed side platforms serving two tracks, connected to a small red-roofed station building by a level crossing. The station is unattended.

Adjacent stations

|-
!colspan=5|Ōigawa Railway

Station history
Nagashima Dam Station was opened on October 2, 1990, when part of the Ikawa Line was re-routed to avoid the rising waters of the lake created by the Nagashima Dam.

Passenger statistics
In fiscal 2017, the station was used by an average of 7 passengers daily (boarding passengers only).

Surrounding area
Nagashima Dam

See also
 List of Railway Stations in Japan

References

External links

 Ōigawa Railway home page

Stations of Ōigawa Railway
Railway stations in Shizuoka Prefecture
Railway stations in Japan opened in 1990
Kawanehon, Shizuoka